Angel: Live Fast, Die Never is a soundtrack album for the TV series Angel.

The album primarily features scores composed by Robert J. Kral. It also contains an extended version of the opening credits by Darling Violetta, performances from actors Andy Hallett, and Christian Kane, as well as Kim Richey's "A Place Called Home" which is featured in the episode "Shells" and VAST's "Touched" which was featured in the second episode "Lonely Hearts". The album was released in the United States on May 17, 2005, a year after the show's final episode.

All of the tracks performed by outside bands meant something special to the show. "I'm Game" was composed by Christophe Beck, who also composed seasons two through four of Buffy the Vampire Slayer, and was used throughout the series as a theme for whenever Angel or his team were involved in heroic actions. "Touched" was considered by many fans to be a theme of the show, and VAST's music was used in the original unaired pilot episode of Angel.

"LA Song" was written by David Greenwalt, who co-created the series, and was performed by Christian Kane, who played Lindsey McDonald through all five seasons of the show. "Lady Marmalade" and "It's Not Easy Being Green" were both performed by  Andy Hallett, the actor who portrayed Lorne in the series. "A Place Called Home" by Kim Richey was performed during the final season as a tribute to the character Fred Burkle.

Elin Carlson provided all vocals featured in the score tracks. Robert J. Kral stated that the tracks were culled from all five seasons of the series based on popularity amongst fans. Many of the tracks are actually extended suites that combine many score pieces from one episode.

Track listing
"Angel Main Theme [The Sanctuary Extended Remix]" - Darling Violetta
"Start the Apocalypse"
"The End of the World"
"Massive Assault"
"Home"
"Hero" (Featuring Elin Carlson)
"Judgment & Jousting"
"The Birth of Angelus" (Featuring Elin Carlson)
"Rebellion"
"The Trials for Darla"
"Dreaming of Darla"
"Untouched/Darla's Fire"
"Darla's Sacrifice"
"Welcome to Pylea"
"Through the Looking Glass"
"Castle Attack"
"Cordy Meets Fred"
"Princess Cordelia"
"Farewell Cordelia"
"I'm Game" - Christophe Beck
"Touched" - VAST
"LA Song" - Christian Kane
"Lady Marmalade" - Andy Hallett
"It's Not Easy Being Green" - Andy Hallett
"A Place Called Home" - Kim Richey

Live Fast, Die Never
Television soundtracks
2005 soundtrack albums